Cave Township is one of twelve townships in Franklin County, Illinois, USA.  As of the 2010 census, its population was 1,756 and it contained 834 housing units.

Geography

Cities, towns, villages
 Thompsonville

Unincorporated towns
 Parrish

Extinct towns
 Ferber
 Kegley
 Locust Grove

Cemeteries
The township contains these six cemeteries: Carter's Temple, Clem, Downs, Eubanks, Isaacs, and Smothers.

Major highways
  Illinois Route 34
  Illinois Route 149

Lakes
 Thompsonville Lake
 West Frankfort City Lake

Demographics

Political districts
 Illinois' 12th congressional district
 State House District 117
 State Senate District 59

References
 
 United States Census Bureau 2007 TIGER/Line Shapefiles
 United States National Atlas

External links
 City-Data.com
 Illinois State Archives

Townships in Franklin County, Illinois
Townships in Illinois